Janet Varney (born ) is an American actress, comedian, writer and producer, known for voicing Korra in the Nickelodeon animated television series The Legend of Korra, co-starring as Sheriff Evie Barret in the television series Stan Against Evil, her role as Becca Barbara in You're the Worst, hosting the JV Club podcast and co-hosting the Avatar: Braving the Elements podcast.

Early life
Varney was born and raised in Tucson, Arizona. She graduated as salutatorian from Rincon High School in 1993 and is an alumna of San Francisco State University, where she majored in theater, graduating with a Bachelor of Arts in 1997. She later pursued a career in interior design before eventually finding her way back into acting. Varney was raised Mormon, but left the church at 17 and began to identify as an agnostic. Varney is of English and Scottish descent.

Career

Television projects
Varney was co-host of The Hollywood Show with Brian Unger, a recurring player on Norm Macdonald's sketch show Back to Norm, and an ensemble player on Crossballs, all for Comedy Central. She also starred in the short-lived Fox comedy Happy Hour. In 2007, Varney appeared in the short films Random Acts of Kindness, Die Hardly Working, Eternal Waters, Worldly Possession, The Losers, Keep Off Grass, and Dress for Success which were made during the reality show On the Lot. She has appeared as recurring character Eve in the web series Back on Topps with Randy and Jason Sklar.

Starting in 2008, she began starring in the HBO television series Entourage, playing television producer Amy Miller who works alongside Eric and Charlie. Varney was also cast in a movie called Best Player, starring opposite Jerry Trainor and Jennette McCurdy. Varney played opposite John C. McGinley on IFC's Stan Against Evil as Sheriff Evie Barret. The show was cancelled in 2019 after three seasons.

In 2012, she assisted Neil Patrick Harris and David Burtka in creating Neil's Puppet Dreams.

In 2018 she also created, produced and starred in Fortune Rookie, an 8 episode web series presented by IFC.

Varney also acts as host on ESCAPE!, a web series broadcast on Geek & Sundry where teams of celebrities work together to get out of an escape room.

Dinner and a Movie
In 2005, Varney replaced Lisa Kushell as the host of the TBS cooking and entertainment show Dinner and a Movie. She appeared with Paul Gilmartin and Claud Mann in each episode, introducing films and injecting humor during the preparation of a creative dinner for some themes. The series was cancelled in 2011.

RiffTrax
Varney has written and performed several comedic audio commentaries for films along with fellow SF Sketchfest co-founder Cole Stratton. These appear on the RiffTrax website under the RiffTrax Presents branding, as they are officially sanctioned by RiffTrax founder and Mystery Science Theater 3000 alumnus Michael J. Nelson.

She has performed in Rifftrax commentaries for the following films:
Footloose
Poltergeist
Ghost
Dirty Dancing
Jaws 3-D
Flatliners
The Lost Boys
Dreamscape
Batman vs Superman

Other professional projects
Varney is the co-founder, creative director and producer of SF Sketchfest, the San Francisco Comedy Festival, and is also the co-founder of the San Francisco sketch group Totally False People. She is a core member of the Los Angeles based improv group Theme Park Improv. She performed with the Los Angeles and San Francisco-based group Sequel 4000. In March 2012, she launched a podcast entitled The JV Club, hosted on Nerdist.com from 2012 to 2018. In November 2018, it was announced that The JV Club would be moving to the Maximum Fun network.

Varney has participated on a regular basis on the improv comedy podcast Spontaneanation with Paul F. Tompkins, where she is referred to as "Little Janet" Varney. She is also one of the core cast members of the improvised SciFi podcast Voyage to the Stars, and the podcast Thrilling Adventure Hour.

Avatar: Braving the Elements, an official Nickelodeon companion podcast to Avatar: The Last Airbender, premiered on June 22, 2021, hosted by Varney (the voice of Korra) and Dante Basco (the voice of Zuko). The podcast is an episode-by-episode deep dive into the Avatarverse with special guest appearances.

She also appeared on Hello from the Magic Tavern as Braidwynn the Warrior Elf and Crone Bakeress.

Personal life
Varney dated comedian Chris Hardwick from 2004 to 2011. In 2018, she married fellow writer, Brandon Reynolds. In 2018, Varney came out as bisexual. In young adulthood, Varney was diagnosed with depersonalization disorder.

Filmography

Film

Television

Video games

Awards and nominations

References

External links
Official Website

Dinner and a Movie website on tbs.com
Rifftrax Presents website at Rifftrax.com
Podcast Interview on The Gentlemen's Club with Caleb Bacon

1970s births
Living people
21st-century American actresses
21st-century American comedians
Actresses from Tucson, Arizona
American agnostics
American film actresses
American former Christians
American people of English descent
American people of Scottish descent
American podcasters
American television actresses
American television hosts
American voice actresses
American women comedians
American women podcasters
Bisexual actresses
Former Latter Day Saints
Bisexual comedians
LGBT people from Arizona
San Francisco State University alumni
American women television presenters
American bisexual actors
American LGBT comedians